Brønderslev is a municipality (Danish, kommune) in North Jutland Region in Denmark. It covers an area of 630 km² and has a total population of 36,194 (2021). The municipal council is located in the town of Brønderslev.

The municipality was created as the result of 2007 Kommunalreformen, and consists of the former municipalities of Brønderslev and Dronninglund. The resulting municipality was originally named Brønderslev-Dronninglund Municipality (Danish: Brønderslev-Dronninglund Kommune),  the longest name of a municipality in Denmark with 32 characters. At their first meeting, the municipal council agreed to shorten the name to its current form: Brønderslev Municipality.

Communities

Municipal council
Since 2007, Brønderslev's municipal council has consisted of 27 members, elected every four years.

Twin towns

Brønderslev is twinned with:
 Eidsberg, Norway
 Nässjö, Sweden

References

Brønderslev Municipality
Municipalities of the North Jutland Region
Municipalities of Denmark
Populated places established in 2007